Café Müller is a dance choreographed by Pina Bausch set to the music of Henry Purcell. It has been performed regularly since its creation and in May 1978 was performed and filmed at the Opernhaus, and broadcast on German television in December of that year.

Performance history

Original production 
Pina Bausch created and performed Café Müller for her dance company Tanztheater Wuppertal. The performance took place on May 20, 1978 at the Opernhaus Wuppertal. The dance was inspired by and based on her childhood memories of watching her father work at his café in Germany during and immediately following World War II.

Televised broadcast 
Café Müller was broadcast on German television in December 1985.

Director and choreographer: Pina Bausch

Music: Henry Purcell's The Fairy-Queen and Dido and Aeneas.

Costume and Set Designer: Rolf Borzik

Cast: 
 Pina Bausch
 Malou Airaudo
 Domenique Mercy
 Jan Minarik
 Nazareth Panadero
 Jean Laurent Sasportes

Tours 
1980: Nancy
1980: Curitiba, Rio de Janeiro, Sao Paulo, Porto Alegre, Santiago de Chile, Buenos Aires, Lima, Bogota, Caracas, Mexico City
1981: Parma, Torin, En Gedi, En Hashovez, Jerusalem, Tel Aviv, Cologne
1982: Paris, Vienna, Rome
1983: Hamburg 1984 Sassari, Cagliari, Los Angeles, New York, Toronto, Hamburg
1985: Paris, Venice, Madrid, Grenoble
1986: Lyon, Tokyo, Osaka, Kyoto
1987: East-Berlin, Gera, Cottbus, Dresden, Athens, Wroclaw, Prague, Kosice
1988: Reggio, Cremona, Bologna, Modena
1992: Edinburgh
1993: Munich, Paris, Moscow
1994: Lisbon
1995: Budapest, Frankfurt, Amsterdam, Avignon, Tel Aviv
1998: Stockholm, Malmö
1999: Berlin
2002: Leuven, Geneva, Dresden
2003: Bochum
2006: Brussels, Tokyo, Athens
2007: Beijing
2008: London, Lisbon, Barcelona
2008: Düsseldorf
2009: São Paulo
2010: Seoul, Monaco
2011: Warsaw
2013: Taipei, Kaohsiung, Goeteborg, Naples, Bordeaux, Antwerpen
2016: Wellington, Nîmes
2017: Ghent, New York, Antwerp, Ottawa, Hong Kong

Summary of movement 
The piece takes place on a stage strewn with chairs. The chairs are placed randomly, but cover the length of the performance space. There is a door upstage right leading to a revolving door, and doors on either side of the stage.

There are six dancers, three men and three women. Two of the men wear suits, the third wears a loose white shirt tucked into trousers and dances barefoot. Two of the women, one portrayed by Bausch herself, wear long white dresses with bare feet, the other wears a dress, overcoat, and heels.

The dance moves about the stage, dancers shifting in and out of duet. At various moments, one or more dance with eyes closed, rushing across the stage strewn with chairs while the other dancers rush about them moving furniture out of the way.

The movement is often frantic and repetitive, halting with a feeling of exhaustion. There are themes of manipulation and dependence throughout the dance, which are realized through intense repetition as well as trust between dancers that they will keep each other safe on stage in varying states of awareness. The dancers rely on each other to clear their paths as they dance with their eyes shut, a strong example of the trust shared on-stage.

References

External links 
 
 https://vimeo.com/118644761

Further reading 
 https://prelectur.stanford.edu/lecturers/bausch/cafe_m.html
 https://jildysauce.wordpress.com/2012/06/29/cafe-muller/

dance
1978 ballet premieres
Modern dancers
Modern dance
Culture in Wuppertal